Brunei Darussalam participated in the 2018 Asian Games in Jakarta and Palembang, Indonesia from 18 August to 2 September 2018. The contingent comprises 15 athletes and 16 officials led by Umi Kalthum binti Haji Abdul Karim as the Chef de Mission. Brunei wushu star Basma Lachkar was given the honor to be the country’s flag-bearer at the opening ceremony.

Competitors
The following is a list of the number of competitors representing Brunei Darussalam that will participate at the Games:

Athletics

Equestrian 

Jumping

Golf 

Brunei participated in golf competition at the Games.

Men

Karate

Brunei represented by the 2017 SEA Games bronze medalist, Wahidah Kamarul Zaman, who participated in the women's kata event.

Pencak silat 

Seni

Weightlifting

Brunei entered the weightlifting competition at the Games with one athlete. Ak Yusri Amir Pg Dato Setia Yusof finished in the 11th position after lifts a total 188 kg.

Men

Wushu 

Taolu

See also
 Brunei at the 2018 Asian Para Games

References 

Brunei at the Asian Games
Nations at the 2018 Asian Games
2018 in Bruneian sport